General elections were held in Costa Rica on 2 February 1986. Óscar Arias of the National Liberation Party won the presidential election, whilst his party also won the parliamentary election. Voter turnout was 81.8%.

Costa Rica was under a strong two-party system at the time. The country was undergoing military tensions with neighboring Nicaragua due to the recently happened Sandinista Revolution and Nicaragua's dictator Daniel Ortega's fighting of the right-wing Contra rebel guerilla in its southern border disregarding the official limits and confronting Costa Rica's police and security forces. Such skirmishes left one policeman's death and several wounded and both countries at the edge of war. Whilst some people blamed former president Rodrigo Carazo for allowing the FSLN to operate in the Costa Rican northern territory against then dictator Anastasio Somoza, others resented President Luis Alberto Monge's hawkish behavior toward Sandinista Nicaragua and his support of the Contras.

Former minister and deputy Oscar Arias faced former vice president Carlos Manuel Castillo in closed primaries. Castillo had the support of PLN's traditional leadership including former presidents and party's founders José Figueres Ferrer, Daniel Oduber Quirós and Luis Alberto Monge. Arias was seen as a young, alternative candidate and the "underdog" in the election, but managed to earn the majority of votes and popular support.

On the other side of the two-party system former Foreign Minister (under Carazo's administration) Rafael Ángel Calderón Fournier, son of historical leader of Calderonismo Rafael Ángel Calderón Guardia, was nominated by the Social Christian Unity Party, then main opposition force. This was Calderón's second attempt to win the Presidency.

During the campaign the topic of peace was central. Calderón tried to present himself as a hawk who felt no quarrels in facing Nicaragua militarily. Arias on the contrary tried to show himself as a man of peace and negotiator who would pacified the region. His slogan was "Paz para mi gente" (Peace for my People). In fact, some analysts also saw Arias' position as a strong criticism of Monge, of his own party, and his hardline position. Monge and Arias would be political enemies ever since.

PLN campaign also focused in showing Calderón as a man of war and remembering old historical periods, blaming Calderonism for the 1948 Civil War and the 1955 Somoza-endorsed Calderonistas' invasion attempt. The party even went so far as to show Calderón in a cartoon as a spoil kid ready for war wearing the clothing of Quico, a popular character from El Chavo del Ocho.

Results

President

1 The People's Alliance was a coalition of the People's Vanguard Party and the Broad Democratic Front.

By province

Parliament

By province

Local governments

Ballot

References

1986 elections in Central America
1986 in Costa Rica
Elections in Costa Rica